Isaacus Rothovius (1 November 1572 – 10 February 1652) was the Bishop of Turku from 1627 till 1652.

Family 
Rothovius was born in Småland in southern Sweden in 1572, the son of a farmer Börje Larsson. Rothovius' grandfather was a German immigrant captain named Lorentz Roth. Rothovius' twin brother, Jonas Rothovius, was the Superintendent of Kalmar from 1618 till 1626.

Education
Rothovius at several upper secondary schools and in 1595 went to Uppsala, where in 1597 he became a teacher to the brothers Axel Oxenstierna, Krister Oxenstierna and Gabriel Oxenstierna, with whom he went to Germany that same year and visited the universities in Rostock and Wittenberg. While in Wittenberg, Rothovius acquired a Master of Philosophy in 1602. He was also ordained  a priest in 1602. Later he returned to his homeland and was appointed in 1603 to be vicar of Nyköping, where he remained until 1627.

Bishop
In 1627 he was appointed as Bishop of Turku, however he did not speak Finnish when he arrived in Turku. He also considered the Finns (especially during the early years of his term) to be barbaric. Bishop Rothovius forced the Finnish Evangelical Lutheran Church and its priests to change several of their customs, such as reading different Bible passages from different sides of the church, and wearing colourful garments, which reminded him of Finland's Roman Catholic past.  Bishop Rothovius's most notable achievements were his help in speeding up the translation of the entire Bible into Finnish (completed in 1642), and in changing the Turku Cathedral School into the Gymnasium of Turku (an upper secondary school) in 1630, and in supporting the establishment of the Academy of Turku (now the University of Turku) in 1640. He also contributed to the formation of some parish churches, such as the separation of Myrskylä from Pernå in 1636.

See also
List of bishops of Turku

References

External links

1572 births
1652 deaths
Lutheran archbishops and bishops of Turku
Swedish Lutheran bishops
17th-century Finnish people
17th-century Swedish people
Swedish people of German descent